The Cagni or Ammiraglio Cagni class was a class of submarines built for Italy's Regia Marina during World War II.

Design
These submarines were designed as commerce raiders for oceanic operations. They had high endurance and a large torpedo load for extended patrols. A smaller  torpedo was chosen, rather than the standard , as the Italians believed this was adequate to deal with merchant ships. The boats were designed to have the range to sail non-stop from Italy to Kismayu, Italian Somaliland where a new submarine base was to be built. In order to operate in the Indian Ocean Monsoon the submarines were fitted with large conning towers and armed with two  / 47 caliber guns.

The large conning towers were rebuilt to a smaller German style as a result of war experience. Ammiraglio Cagni carried out a -month patrol in the South Atlantic during 1942–43. The other three boats were used as transport submarines to supply Italian forces in North Africa.

Ships
All four boats were built by CRDA Monfalcone, laid down in 1939 and completed in 1941.

12 more boats were planned for the 1940 and 1941 ship building programmes but were cancelled as a result of the outbreak of World War II.

Operational history

Ammiraglio Cagni
Her first operational patrols were in the Mediterranean, doing five transport missions and 16 patrols. Her first mission in the Atlantic was of 136 days, sinking the British tanker Dagomba and the Greek sloop Argo on 29 November 1942.

Ammiraglio Cagni was used in two theatres, the Mediterranean and South-Atlantic/Indian Ocean. She made 21 sorties in the Mediterranean, and 2 sorties in the South Atlantic/Indian Ocean in 1942–43.

On 9 September 1943, while on her second Atlantic sortie, she received news of the armistice. She surrendered to the UK at Durban on 20 September 1943. HMS Jasmine took part in the formal surrender.

Mediterranean missions:
While under the command of Lieutenant Commander Charles Liannazza, on 15 October 1941, she sailed from Taranto to Bardia, with a cargo of 140 tonnes of fuel cans and ammunition. She returned to Taranto on 22 October, while en route was attacked by guns and depth charges but suffered no damage. She carried out a similar mission on 18 November. She completed further 5 offensive and 16 transport missions.

Atlantic 1st mission:
On 5 or 6 October 1942, she sailed from La Maddalena to the South-Atlantic for her 1st Atlantic mission, against the convoy "TS 23". She crossed the Strait of Gibraltar on 12 October without any contact. But on 3 November, while submerged at daytime, she attacked and sank a 3,845 GRT Elder Dempster Lines motor ship Dagomba. On 29 November, while patrolling off Cape of Good Hope, Africa (in the immediate vicinity of Cape Town) she sank the 1,995 GRT Greek ship Argo.

On 3 January 1943, she attempted to re-arm by torpedo transfer on Tazzoli, but failed due to adverse weather conditions. 
But she was successfully fuelled on 13 January, with 45 tonnes of fuel by a German submarine.

On 15 February, in the Bay of Biscay, she was attacked from the air, by bombs and machine-gun fire, that led to the death of Sergeant Gunner Michelangelo Cannistraro.

This single mission (began on 6 October 1942 in Magdalene, and ended on 20 February 1943 in Bordeaux) lasted for 136 days.

Atlantic 2nd mission (Indian Ocean 1st mission):
The second and last mission of Cagni began on 29 June 1943 and ended in Durban on 20 September 1943, lasted for over 84 days.
She was commanded by Lieutenant Commander Joseph Roselli Lorenzini on this mission. She had received orders to proceed to Singapore, to attack merchant shipping in the South Atlantic and Indian Ocean, and returned with a load of rubber and tin.

On 17 July 1943, off the Canary Islands, she encountered a steamer of 5,500 GRT of unknown nationality. On 25 July, she torpedoed the 22,071 GRT UK armed merchant cruiser HMS Asturias (in position 06°52'N; 20°45'W). Asturias boiler room and machinery spaces were flooded and she lost all power, but the badly damaged AMC managed to escape to Freetown under tow. On 30 July Ammiraglio Cagni crossed the equator, and on 28 August, she entered into Indian Ocean.

On 8 or 9 September, while just 1,800 miles from Singapore, she received the news of the armistice and was ordered to make the port of Durban. On 20 September, she arrived, was intercepted by HMS Jasmine and escorted into Durban, where she formally surrendered to the UK.

On 8 November, she left for Taranto, where she arrived on 2 January 1944. Based in Palermo, she was used for anti-submarine training activities for Allied planes. On 10 February 1948, she was decommissioned and later broken up.

Ammiraglio Caracciolo
On 11 December 1941, she unsuccessfully attacked a British convoy and suffered damage by depth charges and gunfire from the destroyer HMS Farndale. She was scuttled to avoid capture. 53 men were rescued – and taken prisoner – by the British destroyer.

Ammiraglio Millo
Only carried out eight missions and all were transport operations. On 14 March 1942, returning from patrol in the waters of Malta, she was torpedoed and sunk by the submarine HMS Ultimatum, with the loss of 57 members of her crew.

Ammiraglio Saint-Bon
Only carried out ten missions, all transport operations. She was sunk by the submarine HMS Upholder on 5 January 1942; only three crewman survived.

See also
 Italian submarines of World War II

Notes

References

 Brice, Martin Axis Blockade Runners of World War II (1981) Naval Institute Press 
 Enrico Cernuschi & Vincent P O'Hara, The Breakout Fleet, Oceanic Programmes of the Regia Marina, in Warship 2006, Conway's Maritime Press.

External links
Betasom
Uboat.net
The Flower-class corvettes
 Ammiraglio Cagni Marina Militare website

Submarine classes
 
 Cagni